{{DISPLAYTITLE:C4H7N3O3}}
The molecular formula C4H7N3O3 may refer to:

 Cytosine glycol, intermediate unstable products of cytosine oxidation
 Quisqualamine, the α-decarboxylated analogue of quisqualic acid

Molecular formulas